Gursken or Haugsbygda is a village in the municipality of Sande in Møre og Romsdal county in the western part of Norway.  The village is situated on a narrow strip of relatively flat land along the Gursken fjord on the west side of the island of Gurskøya.  Gursken Church is located in the village.  Neighboring villages are Gjerde (to the north) and Larsnes (to the south). The former Norwegian football player Jan Åge Fjørtoft hails from Gursken.

Economy
Myklebust Verft is the largest employer in the village.  There is a primary school in the village called Gursken Oppvekstsenter. A grocery store is located nearby at the end of the fjord.

References

Villages in Møre og Romsdal
Sunnmøre
Sande, Møre og Romsdal